2038 Bistro, provisional designation , is a stony asteroid from the inner regions of the asteroid belt, approximately 12 kilometers in diameter. The asteroid was discovered on 24 November 1973, by Swiss astronomer Paul Wild at the Zimmerwald Observatory near Bern, Switzerland. It was named for the Bistro restaurant.

Orbit and classification 

Bistro orbits the Sun in the inner main-belt at a distance of 2.2–2.7 AU once every 3 years and 10 months (1,388 days). Its orbit has an eccentricity of 0.09 and an inclination of 15° with respect to the ecliptic. The asteroid's observation arc begins with its official discovery observation at Zimmerwald.

Physical characteristics 

In the SMASS classification, Bistro is a Sa-type asteroid, which transitions from the common S-types to the A-type asteroids.

Lightcurves 

In April 2013, a rotational lightcurve of Bistro was obtained from photometric observations at the Bassano Bresciano Observatory in Italy. Lightcurve analysis gave a rotation period of 17.051 hours with a brightness variation of 0.12 magnitude.

The results supersede three previously published results from fragmentary lightcurves that gave a much shorter period between 7.88 and 8 hours .

Diameter and albedo 

According to the surveys carried out by the Japanese Akari satellite and NASA's Wide-field Infrared Survey Explorer with its subsequent NEOWISE mission, Bistro measures between 10.55 and 13.52 kilometers in diameter and its surface has an albedo between 0.1342 and 0.25.

The Collaborative Asteroid Lightcurve Link derives an albedo of 0.1739 and a diameter of 12.69 kilometers based on an absolute magnitude of 12.0.

Naming 

This minor planet was named Bistro, the small type of restaurant that originated from Paris. The approved naming citation was published by the Minor Planet Center on 1 June 1980.

Notes

References

External links 
 Asteroid Lightcurve Database (LCDB), query form (info )
 Dictionary of Minor Planet Names, Google books
 Asteroids and comets rotation curves, CdR – Observatoire de Genève, Raoul Behrend
 Discovery Circumstances: Numbered Minor Planets (1)-(5000) – Minor Planet Center
 
 

002038
Discoveries by Paul Wild (Swiss astronomer)
Named minor planets
002038
19731124